Yanick Brecher (born 25 May 1993) is a Swiss professional footballer who plays as a goalkeeper for FC Zürich.

Club career

Early career
In his youth, Brecher played for FC Männedorf before joining Zürich. He came up through the Zürich youth system, playing for the under-18s and under-23s before entering the first team.

FC Zürich
Brecher signed for the senior team in the summer of 2011. He made his league debut for the club on 1 June 2013 in a 4–2 away defeat to FC Sion. He played all ninety minutes of the match. In the summer of 2019, Brecher was named captain of FC Zürich. On 8 July 2022, Zürich announced that Brecher had signed a contract extension to keep him at the club through the summer of 2027.

FC Wil (loan)
In July 2014, Brecher was loaned out to Challenge League club FC Wil. He made his league debut for the club on 21 July 2014 in a 4–0 away loss to Winterthur. He played all ninety minutes of the match.

Honors
FC Zürich
Swiss Super League: 2021-22
Challenge League: 2016–17
Swiss Cup: 2013–14, 2015–16, 2017–18

References

External links 
 
 Profile at UEFA.com

1993 births
Living people
Swiss men's footballers
Association football goalkeepers
Switzerland under-21 international footballers
Switzerland youth international footballers
Swiss Super League players
FC Zürich players
FC Wil players
Footballers from Zürich